The effect of taxes on employment is a hotly debated economic and political issue. Some commentators claim that higher taxes lead to lower employment, by reducing the availability of capital to be invested in job-creating enterprises, or by reducing the amount of money available for consumers to use to purchase goods and services, thereby causing a loss of business for purveyors of those goods and services. Other commentators claim that higher taxes lead to higher employment, because governments use those tax revenues to employ government workers, who then purchase goods and services from private businesses, and because governments themselves may act as consumers of goods and services. Higher taxes have also been claimed to increase the confidence of outside investors in the stability of the government, and in the government's willingness and ability to pay debts. On local scales, it has also been claimed that higher taxes in one city, state, or country will motivate businesses to move their operations to other cities, states, or countries with lower taxes. However, it has conversely been claimed that some jurisdictions with relatively high tax burdens experience higher employment than some jurisdictions with relatively low tax burdens, based on the infrastructure and government services that may be provided to businesses operating in that jurisdiction.

In 2015, The Wall Street Journal reported on a paper published by economist Owen Zidar examining state-by-state changes in employment following changes in state and federal taxation since the end of the Second World War. Zidar's examination concluded that reduction of taxes on low-income groups spurs employment growth, while little effect on employment results from reduction of taxes on those in the top ten percent of wealth holders.

References

Tax
Employment